Susie Scanlan  (born June 4, 1990, in St. Paul, Minnesota
) is an American epee fencer. Scanlan was named to the U.S. Olympic team at the 2012 Summer Olympics in the women's epee individual and team competitions, and won a bronze medal in the team event. Scanlan took time off from her studies at Princeton University to train for and compete in the 2012 Olympics.

Scanlan was eliminated in the individual epee round of 64 by Olena Kryvytska of Ukraine by a score of 15–13.  She won a bronze medal in the women's team épée alongside Maya Lawrence, Courtney Hurley, and Kelley Hurley.

See also
List of Princeton University Olympians

References

1990 births
Fencers at the 2012 Summer Olympics
Living people
Olympic bronze medalists for the United States in fencing
Medalists at the 2012 Summer Olympics
American female épée fencers
21st-century American women